"I'm from Long Beach"  is a song by American West Coast hip hop recording artist Snoop Dogg. It was released on December 21, 2015.

Track listing 
Download digital
I'm from Long Beach (Explicit) — 2:52

References

2015 songs
Snoop Dogg songs
Songs written by Snoop Dogg
Gangsta rap songs
G-funk songs